Persia My Dear is an album by bassist Richard Davis, pianist  Sir Roland Hanna and drummer Frederick Waits recorded in Japan in 1987 and released on the Japanese DIW label.

Reception 

AllMusic reviewr Thom Jurek described Persia My Dear as "a sweet little session that features Davis in light of his brilliant arco skills as well as his deep, intricate melodic interplay".

Track listing 
 "Manhattan Safari" (Roland Hanna) - 7:49
 "Southpark and Richard" (Hanna) - 6:02		
 "Summer in Central Park" (Horace Silver) - 5:06		
 "Brownie Speaks" (Clifford Brown) - 6:25		
 "Persia My Dear" (Richard Davis) - 5:25		
 "Strange Vibes" (Silver) - 11:04		
 "Let Me Try" (Hanna) - 8:54

Personnel 
Richard Davis - bass
Sir Roland Hanna - piano
Frederick Wait - drums

References 

1987 albums
Richard Davis (bassist) albums
Roland Hanna albums
DIW Records albums